Francisco Miguel Teixeira Domingues (born 16 April 2002), sometimes known as just Kiko, is a Portuguese professional footballer who plays as a left-back for Portuguese club Benfica B.

Career
Domingues is a youth product of Benfica, and signed his first professional contract with the club on 20 February 2020. On 12 August 2022, he made his senior and professional debut with Benfica B as a late substitute in a 1-1 Liga Portugal 2 tie with Tondela.

References

External links

2002 births
Living people
Footballers from Lisbon
Portuguese footballers
Association football fullbacks
Liga Portugal 2 players
S.L. Benfica B players